Soulpreacher is an American progressive doom metal  band from Raleigh, North Carolina, United States. Influenced by Pink Floyd, My Dying Bride, and Anathema, their music focuses on similar themes of isolation and desperation.

Biography 
Soulpreacher was formed in 1998 by Michael Avery, Anthony Staton, Mark Schindler, and Robb Hewlett. Their early sound focused primarily on hateful psychedelic doom metal. Mark Schindler parted ways early on, and Brian Watson was added to the lineup taking over on drums.

In 1999, Soulpreacher signed with the now defunct Man's Ruin Records founded by Frank Kozik, and soon released their debut studio album Sonic Witchcraft. The band went on to release the follow-up album When the Black Sunn Rises...the Holy Men Burn in 2000 on the Colorado label Game Two/Berserker Records.

Following Michael Avery's departure to law school in 2004, the band added Chris Hill and Trent Giardino. With the addition of the two new guitarists, the band's sound grew darker, and more melancholic.

In 2004, the band released the Lost Words Demo. 

In 2012, Soulpreacher founding members Anthony Staton and Michael Avery reunited to create Horseskull, with drummer Eric B. and bassist Joseph Pautz.  Pautz was later replaced by Soulpreacher bassist Robb Hewlett.

Members

Current members
Anthony Staton - vocals
Robb Hewlett - bass
Chris Hill - guitar
Trent Giardino - guitar
Marc Campbell - drums

Former members
Michael Avery - guitar
Mark Schindler - drums
Brian Watson - drums

Discography

Demos 
Worship Demo 1998
Demo 2003
Lost Words Demo 2004

Studio albums 
Sonic Witchcraft (1999, Man's Ruin)
When The Black Sunn Rises... The Holy Men Burn (2000, Game Two/Berserker Records)

Compilation albums 
Transcendental Maggot (Meconium Records, 1999)
''Dreams of What Life Could Have Been" (Psychedoomelic Records, 2004)

External links 

Soulpreacher - official Myspace

Heavy metal musical groups from North Carolina
American doom metal musical groups
Musical groups established in 1998
Musical groups from Raleigh, North Carolina